Colégio Humboldt São Paulo is a German international school in the Interlagos neighborhood of São Paulo, São Paulo, Brazil. The school serves infant school through the final year of secondary school.

History
The German school first opened on May 1, 1916; the impetus came during a May 13, 1916 meeting at the Lindau Bakery. Ginasio Humboldt Santo Amaro was previously in Santo Amaro, São Paulo. The school received its current name, Colégio Humboldt, in 1966, after its Oberstufe opened. The current campus in Interlagos opened in 1999.

See also
 German Brazilian
Phone Contact :11 5686-4055

References

External links

  Colégio Humboldt São Paulo
  Colégio Humboldt São Paulo

International schools in São Paulo
German-Brazilian culture
Sao Paulo
European-Brazilian culture in São Paulo
Private schools in Brazil
Secondary schools in Brazil